The Currumbin Creek is a creek located in South East Queensland, Australia.

Course and features

The Currumbin Creek rises in the Gold Coast hinterland below Mount Cougal in the Springbrook National Park, west of the New South Wales settlement of Tomewin and north of the New South Wales/Queensland border. The creek flows generally north by east through the Currumbin Valley towards  where it is crossed by the Pacific Motorway and the Gold Coast Highway, before reaching its mouth at Currumbin Alley and emptying into the Coral Sea. The creek descends  over its  course.

Near the creek mouth at Currumbin Alley a -long and -wide swimming canal points northward. The demolition of the Palm Beach Bowls Club cleared way for a grass park and path to the shore of the canal, which is ideal for swimming, unlike many of the bull shark waters and canals further inland. Currumbin Creek has an extensive canal system similar to its cousin Tallebudgera Creek and the larger, further north Nerang River. The shores of these canals boast some of the Gold Coast's most prestigious housing. The lower estuary is a dynamic environment, strongly influenced by the processes of tidal flushing and infilling by coastal sands. This process leads to the natural constriction of the creek mouth, and requires intermittent dredging to minimise flood impacts.  The lower estuary provides a significant aquatic and shore based recreational resource for the city, attracting fishermen, swimmers, surfers and boating enthusiasts.

The City of Gold Coast runs a volunteer Beaches to Bushland restoration program. The Currumbin Creek Care Group established in 2008 helps restore native vegetation in parkland running on the lower areas of Currumbin Creek.

History

The first bridge across the creek was opened in 1926. The road was then known as the Main Ocean Road, later to be upgraded as the Pacific Highway and now known as the Gold Coast Highway.

Dredging has taken place at Currumbin Creek informally between 1974–1997 and then on a yearly basis to date. During 2007, a dredging operation took place at the mouth of the creek, making the bottom of Currumbin Alley very shallow, creating a calm lagoon for families and children to play in. Due to a build-up of sand in the creek mouth, not even permitting a jet ski from the creek to the ocean, the Gold Coast City Council announced an operation beginning late in 2008 to deepen the mouth and move sand to the nearby Palm Beach so that beach sand reduced by erosion is replaced.

A boardwalk winds through the small Boree Bodalla Mangrove Reserve with two fishing platforms. It is a popular cycling, running, and walking track and is a serene setting along the creek shore.

See also

References

External links

Geography of Gold Coast, Queensland
Rivers of Queensland
Currumbin, Queensland